Hologram of Baal is the eleventh album by the Australian alternative rock band The Church, released in September 1998.

It was written and recorded following the full-time return of founding guitarist Peter Koppes, who had left the band in 1992 after the Priest=Aura tour. It was also the first album which the band had produced on their own and was recorded and mixed by their drummer Tim Powles. Album titles originally proposed by singer Steve Kilbey included Bastard Universe and Hologram of Allah, but these were rejected as too inflammatory. In the end, the latter was amended with the name of a deity from the Canaanite pantheon and the former was used as the title of the bonus disc. The song "This Is It" is about the death of INXS front man and fellow Australian, Michael Hutchence.

The bonus disc, Bastard Universe, included with the first pressings, contained a seemingly continuous 79 minute instrumental improvisation, divided into six "stages". The U.S. and U.K. pressings list only four "stages", although all six tracks are present on the CDs.

The original Australian cover design, featuring a green, full-frame, pseudo-holographic image of a primitive mask, was heavily modified for the U.S. and U.K. releases. These feature a plain reddish-brown image of the mask, originally used inside the Australian booklet, placed to the right (U.S.) or left (U.K.) of a vertical black bar containing the band's name in large dark blue type.

During the subsequent U.S. tour in 1999, Kilbey was arrested in New York City for attempting to purchase heroin. He was sentenced to community service by sweeping subway cars. The band performed the following night at New York's Bowery Ballroom with Marty Willson-Piper serving as lead vocalist. There is a bootleg recording of the show known as Steveless in New York City.

Track listing
All songs written by Kilbey/Koppes/Powles/Willson-Piper
"Anaesthesia" - 5:18
"Ricochet" - 3:34
"Louisiana" - 6:04
"The Great Machine" - 5:48
"No Certainty Attached" - 4:00
"Tranquility" - 7:38
"Buffalo" - 4:14
"This Is It" - 4:23
"Another Earth" - 3:32
"Glow-Worm" - 6:07

Bastard Universe (bonus disc)
"Stage 1" - 15:52
"Stage 2" - 11:31
"Stage 3" - 13:04
"Stage 4" - 12:23
"Stage 5" - 10:49
"Stage 6" - 15:40

Personnel 

Steve Kilbey – lead vocals, bass guitar, keyboards, guitar
Peter Koppes – guitars, keyboards, bass guitar, backing vocals
Tim Powles – drums, percussion, bass guitar, backing vocals
Marty Willson-Piper – guitars, bass guitar, backing vocals
with
William Bowden – radiotronics on tracks 1, 2, 3, 4, 8 & 9
Linda Neil – violin on tracks 3 and 10

References 

The Church (band) albums
1998 albums
Space rock albums